Leofric (died 31 August or 30 September 1057) was an Earl of Mercia. He founded monasteries at Coventry and Much Wenlock. Leofric is most remembered as the husband of Lady Godiva.

Life
Leofric was the son of Leofwine, Ealdorman of the Hwicce, who witnessed a charter in 997 for King Æthelred II. Leofric had three brothers: Northman, Edwin and Godwine. It is likely that Northman is the same as Northman Miles ("Northman the knight") to whom King Æthelred II granted the village of Twywell in Northamptonshire in 1013. Northman, according to the Chronicle of Crowland Abbey, the reliability of which is often doubted by historians, says he was a retainer (knight) of Eadric Streona, the Earl of Mercia. It adds that Northman had been killed upon Cnut's orders along with Eadric and others for this reason. Cnut "made Leofric ealdorman in place of his brother Northman, and afterwards held him in great affection."

Becoming Earl of Mercia, which occurred at some date previous to 1032, made him one of the most powerful men in the land, second only to the ambitious Earl Godwin of Wessex, among the mighty earls. Leofric may have had some connection by marriage to Ælfgifu of Northampton, the first wife of Cnut, which might help to explain why he was the chief supporter of her son Harold Harefoot against Harthacnut, Cnut's son by Emma of Normandy, when Cnut died in 1035. However, Harold died in 1040 and was succeeded by his brother Harthacnut, who made himself unpopular by implementing heavy taxation during his short reign. Two of his tax-collectors were killed at Worcester by angry locals. The king was so enraged by this that in 1041 he ordered Leofric and his other earls to plunder and burn the city, and lay waste to the surrounding area. This command must have sorely tested Leofric, since Worcester was the cathedral city of the Hwicce, his people.

When Harthacnut died suddenly in 1042, he was succeeded by his half-brother Edward the Confessor. Leofric loyally supported Edward when Edward came under threat at Gloucester, from Earl Godwin, in 1051. Leofric and Earl Siward of Northumbria gathered a great army to meet that of Godwin. His advisors counseled Edward that battle would be folly, since there would be important members of the nobility on both sides; the loss of these men, should many die in battle, would leave England open to its enemies. So in the end the issue was resolved by less bloody means: in accordance with Leofric's advice the settlement of the dispute was referred to the Witenagemot, and Earl Godwin and his family were outlawed for a time. Earl Leofric's power was then at its height. But in 1055 Leofric's own son Ælfgar was outlawed, "without any fault", says the Anglo-Saxon Chronicle. Ælfgar raised an army in Ireland and Wales and brought it to Hereford, where he clashed with the army of Earl Ralph of Herefordshire and severely damaged the town. The Anglo-Saxon Chronicle wryly comments "And then when they had done most harm, it was decided to reinstate Earl Ælfgar".

Leofric died in 1057 at his estate at Kings Bromley in Staffordshire. According to the Anglo-Saxon Chronicle, he died on 30 September, but the chronicler of Worcester gives the date as 31 August. Both agree that he was buried in Coventry at St Mary's Priory and Cathedral. Leofric was succeeded by his son Ælfgar as earl.

Religious works
Earl Leofric and Godiva were noted for great generosity to religious houses. In 1043 he founded and endowed a Benedictine monastery at Coventry. John of Worcester tells us that "He and his wife, the noble Countess Godgifu, a worshipper of God and devout lover of St Mary ever-virgin, built the monastery there from the foundations out of their own patrimony, and endowed it adequately with lands and made it so rich in various ornaments that in no monastery in England might be found the abundance of gold, silver, gems and precious stones that was at that time in its possession."

In the 1050s Leofric and Godiva appear jointly as benefactors in a document granting land to the monastery of St Mary, Worcester, and the endowment of the minster at Stow St Mary, Lincolnshire. They are commemorated as benefactors of other monasteries as well, at Leominster, Chester, Much Wenlock, and Evesham.

Family
Apart from Northman, killed in 1017, Leofric had at least two other brothers: Edwin was killed in battle by Gruffydd ap Llywelyn in 1039, and Godwine died some time before 1057.

Leofric may have married more than once. His famous wife Godgifu (Godiva) survived him and may have been a second or later wife. Since there is some question about the date of marriage for Leofric and Godgifu, it is not clear whether she was the mother of Ælfgar, Leofric's only known child. If Godiva was married to Earl Leofric later than about 1010, she could not have been the mother.

Historicity
Leofric used a double-headed eagle as his personal emblem, and this has been adopted by various units of the British Army as a symbol for Mercia.

Historians disagree extensively on the character of Leofric. Folklore tends to depict him as an unfeeling overlord who imposed over-taxation, whereas many historians object to this, and consider it as part of the Lady Godiva myth; they suggest that he was a strong and respected leader. There is also great disagreement over his reputation as a military leader: some historians believe Leofric to have been weak in this respect, but others go as far as to give him the title 'Hammer of the Welsh'.

Visio Leofrici 
A prose account of Leofric's life, entitled Visio Leofrici or the Vision of Leofric, was written in Old English, surviving in MS Corpus Christi College, Cambridge (CCCC) 367. It is split into four episodes, each of which depicts one of Leofric's miraculous visions. The last of these four has been noted for its similarities to the account of Leofric's vision in Osbert's later account of the life of Edward the Confessor.

In popular culture
On screen, Leofric was portrayed by Roy Travers in the British silent short Lady Godiva (1928), George Nader in the film Lady Godiva of Coventry (1955), and Tony Steedman in the BBC TV series Hereward the Wake (1965). He also may have inspired the character "Leofric", played by Adrian Bower in the BBC series The Last Kingdom.

Citations

Sources

External links
 

|-

1057 deaths
Year of birth unknown
Earls of Mercia
11th-century English nobility
Lady Godiva